Sandahiru Seya is a second largest hemispherical stupa in Sri Lanka located in Anuradhapura.

History 

The stupa was built in commemoration of the fallen war heroes of the Sri Lanka Armed Forces in Sri Lankan Civil War which was ended in 2009.

The foundation stone was laid by President Mahinda Rajapaksa on 22 November 2010. The work was completed and the stupa was opened by President Gotabaya Rajapaksa and Prime Minister Mahinda Rajapaksa on 18 November 2021.

This is the largest dagoba built in Sri Lanka after the construction of the Jethavanaramaya in Anuradhapura by King Mahasen in AD 301. The pagoda’s structural completion was carried out with the support of hundreds of Army, Navy, Air Force, Police and Civil Security Department personnel of respective security establishments. Stupa houses the sacred relics including the Kapilavastu relics. There are 1895 gemstones, inlaid with gold as well as pearls.

Gallery

References

Stupas in Sri Lanka
Stupas in Anuradhapura